McCall is a Gaelic surname, of Irish and Scottish origin.

Notable people with this surname include:
Andy McCall (footballer, born 1911) (1911–1979), Scottish footballer and manager
Andy McCall (footballer, born 1925) (1925–2014), Scottish footballer, father of Stuart McCall
Annie McCall (1859–1949), English doctor
Archie McCall (1867–1936), Scottish footballer
Bruce McCall (born 1935), Canadian author
Carl McCall (born 1935), U.S. politician
Christina McCall (1935–2005), Canadian political writer
David McCall (1940–2021), Australian Anglican bishop, husband of Marion
Davina McCall (born 1967), British television presenter
Duke Kimbrough McCall (1914–2013), U.S. religious leader
Edward McCall (1790–1853), U.S. Navy officer
Frederick McCall (1896–1949), Canadian aviator, World War I ace, businessman
George A. McCall (1802–1868), U.S. Army general and amateur naturalist
Grayson McCall (born 2000), American football player
Guadalupe Garcia McCall, a Mexican-American poet and novelist
Helen McCall (1899–1956), Canadian photographer 
Ian McCall (footballer) (born 1965), Scottish footballer
Jack McCall (1850s–1877), U.S. outlaw
James McCall (politician) (1774–1856), American merchant and politician from New York
James McCall (veterinary surgeon) (1834–1915), founder and the first principal of Glasgow Veterinary College
James McCall (footballer) (1865–1925), Scottish footballer
John E. McCall (1859–1920), judge and politician from Tennessee
John T. McCall (1863–1950), New York politician
Kevin McCall (born 1985), American rapper
Louis A. McCall Sr. (1951–1997), American singer, songwriter, drummer and co-founder of the funk/R&B band Con Funk Shun
Marion McCall (born 1943), Australian pilot, wife of David
Marquan McCall (born 1999), American football player
Matt McCall (racing driver) (born 1981), American stock car racing driver and crew chief
Oliver McCall (born 1965), U.S. boxer
P. J. McCall, songwriting pseudonym of Peter Dawson (bass-baritone)
Patrick Joseph McCall (1861–1919), Irish songwriter (also known as P. J. McCall)
Phil McCall (1925–2002), Scottish actor
Porsha N. Mccall (born 1986), mother of 4
Robert McCall (disambiguation), multiple people
Robin McCall (born 1964), American stock car racing driver
Roz McCall, Scottish politician
Samuel W. McCall (1851–1923), U.S.  politician
Steve McCall (born 1960), English footballer
Stuart McCall (born 1964), Scottish footballer
Tahjere McCall (born 1994), American basketball player
Ted McCall (1901–1975), Canadian journalist and comic strip writer
Thomas McCall (disambiguation), several people
Tom McCall (1913–1983), U.S. politician
William McCall (disambiguation), several people
Willie McCall (footballer, born 1898) (1898–1966), Scottish footballer
Willie McCall (footballer born 1920) (1920–1985), Scottish footballer

Fictional characters include:
the title character of Cash McCall, a 1960 film starring James Garner
Robert McCall, star of The Equalizer, a 1980s American television series; The Equalizer, a 2014 film loosely based on the television series; The Equalizer 2, a 2018 sequel; and The Equalizer, a 2020 television series
Scott McCall, protagonist of the television series Teen Wolf

See also
MacColl

Scottish surnames
Surnames of Scottish origin
Anglicised Scottish Gaelic-language surnames